Nate Leipzig (born Nathan Leipziger; May 31, 1873October 13, 1939) was an American vaudeville magician who performed in Europe and the United States. In May 1938, Leipzig was elected president of the SAM (Society of American Magicians). Previous presidents of SAM include Howard Thurston and Harry Houdini.
His innovations of sleight of hand, particularly with card tricks and close-up magic, garnered him respect among fellow magicians. Leipzig was the first magician to perform a stage act using playing cards and thimbles, and is credited with inventing the Side Steal, a.k.a. the Side Slipa technique for secretly removing a playing card from the middle of a deck of cards.

Early years
Leipzig was born the third youngest of eight children—seven boys and one girl—in Stockholm, Sweden. He grew up in Detroit, Michigan and at 12 years old started work as a lens-maker for L. Black & Co. He then joined Max Rudelsheimer's optical business, and worked there 17 years, but continued to accept performance engagements.

References 

1873 births
1939 deaths
American magicians
Swedish emigrants to the United States